= Now Soldiers =

American melodic hardcore punk band

- Origin: Clearwater, Florida, United States
- Genres: Hardcore, punk
- Years active: 2002–2008
- Labels: Significant Records
- Members: Vincent Caffiero; Austin Thomas; Joseph Gordon; Tyler Toth; Ben Sharp

Now Soldiers was a melodic hardcore punk band from Clearwater, Florida. Between 2003 and 2008, Now Soldiers played many shows including a few brief east coast tours and a full United States tour in 2006. The band's only official release was the EP, Sick World, released on Significant Records in 2006. Enduring a name change and many lineup changes, Now Soldiers played their final show at The 688 Skate Park on June 20, 2008.

== Final lineup ==
- Austin Thomas- Guitar Vocals (2002–2008)
- Joseph "Poey" Gordon - Guitar (2002–2008)
- Vincent Caffiero - Drums (2002–2008)
- Tyler Toth - Vocals (2005–2008)
- Ben Sharp - Bass guitar (2006–2008)

== Former members ==
- Christopher Galbraith - bass guitar (2002–2006)
- Randon Martin - bass guitar (summer tour with Barriers Now Bridges 2006)
- Phillip Horne - vocals (2005)

== Discography ==
- Sick World - 2006 on Significant Records
